London Councils is the local government association for Greater London, England. It is a cross-party organisation that represents London's 32 borough councils and the City of London. It was formed in 1995 as a merger of the London Boroughs Association and the Association of London Authorities. In April 2000 it gained further functions as strategic local government in London was reorganised. London Councils is a think tank and lobbying organisation, and also provides some services directly through legislation that allows multiple local authorities to pool responsibility and funding. London Councils is based at 59½ Southwark Street.

History
The Association of London Government (ALG) came out of a merger between the London Boroughs Association and the Association of London Authorities in 1995. The ALA consisted of many, mainly Labour, councils which had left the LBA in the 1980s.

To coincide with the creation of the Greater London Authority, the ALG merged with the London Boroughs Grants Committee, the Greater London Employers Association, the London Housing Unit and the Transport Committee for London on 1 April 2000.

In October 2006 it changed its name from the Association of London Government to London Councils to avoid confusion with the Greater London Authority (GLA) and the Local Government Association (LGA).

Membership
The membership of London Councils comprises the 32 London borough councils, the City of London Corporation, the London Fire and Emergency Planning Authority and the Mayor's Office for Policing and Crime.

The GLA was a member of the ALG for a period, before Mayor Ken Livingstone fell out with leading councillors and withdrew. The two organisations co-ordinate their work.

Executive and lead members
The members of the Executive Committee of London Councils is as follows:

Group whips
 Clyde Loakes, Labour, Waltham Forest
 Ravi Govindia, Conservative, Wandsworth

Purpose

Lobbying
London Councils fights for more resources for London and is committed to getting the best possible deal for London's 33 councils. It also develops policy, lobbies government and others, and runs a range of direct services designed to make life better for Londoners. London Councils represents London local government to national government, European institutions, business and other bodies, lobbying for investment and funding.

Service provision
The direct services it provides on behalf of the boroughs, include the Freedom Pass providing more than a 1.2 million older, disabled and blind people free travel on London's buses, tubes and trains, and the Parking and Traffic Appeals (PATAS) service, the Taxicard and Lorry Control schemes, London Care Placements and NOTIFY – the service that helps homeless families access services. The grants committee provides funding for many local groups who work across London boroughs on issues such as employment, domestic violence, poverty and advocacy and also distributes European Social Fund grants.

Leadership

Chairman
The current Chair of London Councils is  Peter John OBE, Labour leader of Southwark London Borough Council, who replaced Claire Kober on 7 June 2018.

Previous chairs were:
 Peter John OBE, Southwark, 2018 – present
 Claire Kober, Haringey, Labour, 2016-2018
Mayor Jules Pipe, Hackney, Labour, 2010–2016
 Merrick Cockell, Kensington and Chelsea, Conservative, 2006–2010
Mayor Sir Robin Wales, Newham, Labour, 2000–2006
 Toby Harris, Haringey, Labour, 1995–2000

Leaders' Committee
London Councils is run by a committee made up of all the leaders of London's borough councils and meet each month (except August) to discuss and agree policy issues of importance to Londoners and their councils. The committee is supported by a cross-party executive of eleven senior members which acts as a forum for detailed policy development. Each member of the executive holds a specific policy area portfolio. Politically, the Executive comprises councillors in proportion to the party representation on London councils.

Other committees
London Boroughs Grants Committee (from 1 April 2000) 
Transport and Environment Committee (from 1 April 2000) took over Freedom Pass from Transport Committee for London.
London Housing Unit Committee (from 1 April 2000 until 31 March 2008) was a "sectoral joint committee" and not all London borough councils were members.

Capital Ambition
In 2008, a new directorate of London Councils was formed: Capital Ambition. This was formed from the merger of the previous London Centre of Excellence, London Connects and London's regional improvement and efficiency partnership, Capital Ambition. Over the three-year period (2008–11), Capital Ambition provided funding for projects run by London's authorities and local strategic partnerships that were designed to deliver efficiencies, improve performance and support innovative ways of working. Capital Ambition is now closed to new applications for funding although funding for some existing projects will continue until 2015.

See also
List of electoral wards in Greater London
Local Government Association

References

External links
London Councils
Capital Ambition
Freedom Pass
PATAS
Taxicard
London Care Placements
NOTIFY

1995 establishments in England
Local government in London
Local Government Association
Organisations based in the London Borough of Southwark
Organizations established in 1995
Regional employers organisations